Abdelkader Morchid (1938 – 31 October 2016) was a Moroccan footballer. He competed in the men's tournament at the 1964 Summer Olympics.

References

External links
 

1938 births
2016 deaths
Moroccan footballers
Footballers from Rabat
Morocco international footballers
Olympic footballers of Morocco
Footballers at the 1964 Summer Olympics
Association football forwards